Mass-independent isotope fractionation or  Non-mass-dependent fractionation (NMD), refers to any chemical or physical process that acts to separate isotopes, where the amount of separation does not scale in proportion with the difference in the masses of the isotopes. Most isotopic fractionations (including typical kinetic fractionations and equilibrium fractionations) are caused by the effects of the mass of an isotope on atomic or molecular velocities, diffusivities or bond strengths. Mass-independent fractionation processes are  less common, occurring mainly in photochemical and spin-forbidden reactions. Observation of mass-independently fractionated materials can therefore be used to trace these types of reactions in nature and in laboratory experiments.

Mass-independent fractionation in nature
The most notable examples of mass-independent fractionation in nature are found in the isotopes of oxygen and sulfur. The first example was discovered by Robert N. Clayton, Toshiko Mayeda, and Lawrence Grossman in 1973, in the oxygen isotopic composition of refractory calcium-aluminium-rich inclusions in the Allende meteorite. The inclusions, thought to be among the oldest solid materials in the Solar System, show a pattern of low 18O/16O and 17O/16O relative to samples from the Earth and Moon. Both ratios vary by the same amount in the inclusions, although the mass difference between 18O and 16O is almost twice as large as the difference between 17O and 16O. Originally this was interpreted as evidence of incomplete mixing of 16O-rich material (created and distributed by a large star in a supernova) into the Solar nebula. However, recent measurement of the oxygen-isotope composition of the Solar wind, using samples collected by the Genesis spacecraft, shows that the most 16O-rich inclusions are close to the bulk composition of the solar system. This implies that Earth, the Moon, Mars, and asteroids all formed from 18O- and 17O-enriched material. Photodissociation of carbon monoxide in the Solar nebula has been proposed to explain this isotope fractionation.

Mass-independent fractionation also has been observed in ozone. Large, 1:1 enrichments of 18O/16O and 17O/16O in ozone were discovered in laboratory synthesis experiments by Mark Thiemens and John Heidenreich in 1983, and later found in stratospheric air samples measured by Konrad Mauersberger. These enrichments were eventually traced to the three-body ozone formation reaction.

O + O2 → O3* + M → O3 + M*

Theoretical calculations by Rudolph Marcus and others suggest that the enrichments are the result of a combination of mass-dependent and mass-independent kinetic isotope effects (KIE) involving the excited state O3* intermediate related to some unusual symmetry properties.  The mass-dependent isotope effect occurs in asymmetric species, and arises from the difference in zero-point energy of the two formation channels available (e.g., 18O16O + 16O vs 18O + 16O16O for formation of 18O16O16O.) These mass-dependent zero-point energy effects cancel one another out and do not affect the enrichment in heavy isotopes observed in ozone. The mass-independent enrichment in ozone is still not fully understood, but may be due to isotopically symmetric O3* having a shorter lifetime than asymmetric O3*, thus not allowing a statistical distribution of energy throughout all the degrees of freedom, resulting in a mass-independent distribution of isotopes.

Mass-independent carbon dioxide fractionation 

The mass-independent distribution of isotopes in stratospheric ozone can be transferred to carbon dioxide (CO2). This anomalous isotopic composition in CO2 can be used to quantify gross primary production, the uptake of CO2 by vegetation through photosynthesis. This effect of terrestrial vegetation on the isotopic signature of atmospheric CO2 was simulated with a global model and confirmed experimentally.

Mass-independent sulfur fractionation 

Mass-independent fractionation of sulfur can be observed in ancient sediments, where it preserves a signal of the prevailing environmental conditions. The creation and transfer of the mass-independent signature into minerals would be unlikely in an atmosphere containing abundant oxygen, constraining the Great Oxygenation Event to some time after . Prior to this time, the MIS record implies that sulfate-reducing bacteria did not play a significant role in the global sulfur cycle, and that the MIS signal is due primarily to changes in volcanic activity.

See also
 Equilibrium fractionation
 Kinetic fractionation
 Isotope geochemistry

References 

Isotopes
Geochemistry
Fractionation